Fire departments are structured differently around the world. Many firefighters are sworn members with command structures similar to the military and police. They do not have general police powers but have specific powers of enforcement and control in fire and emergency situations.

Australia

New South Wales 
New South Wales Rural Fire Service

Victoria 
Victoria Country Fire Authority

Austria

Salzburg 
Volunteer fire departments

Belgium 

New rank structure of 2015.

Brazil 

Officers

NCO and enlisted grades

Canada 

Ranks amongst Canadian firefighters vary across the country and ranking appears mostly with larger departments:

Toronto

Montreal

Vancouver

Chile 
Ranks are divided between company officers and fire department officers, which can be subdivided between active officers (field officers) and administrative officers. The active officers are the captain, and three or four lieutenants, these four active officers are distinguished by red lines on their helmets.

China

Czech Republic

Denmark

France 

The Paris Fire Brigade belongs to the army and uses army ranks with the corps of engineers badge. The commanding officer has the rank of divisional general. The Marseille Naval Fire Battalion belongs to the navy and uses naval ranks. The commanding officer has the rank of rear admiral. Civilian fire services uses the following ranks. The chief fire officer of a departemental fire brigade can be a comptroller general, a colonel senior class or a colonel, depending on the size of the brigade.

Germany 
In Germany every federal state has its own civil protection laws thus they have different rank systems. Additionally, in the volunteer fire departments, there is a difference between a rank and an official position. This is founded on the military traditions of the fire departments. Every firefighter can hold a high rank without having an official position. A firefighter can be promoted by years of service, training skills and qualifications. Official positions are partly elected or given by capabilities. These conditions allow that older ordinary firefighters have higher ranks than their leaders. But through this ranks are no authorities given (Brevet).

 Professional fire fighters (middle technical grades) of Rheinland-Pfalz
Completed vocational training in a technical occupation suitable for the fire service. Basic firefighter training.

 Professional fire fighters (upper technical grades) of Rheinland-Pfalz
Bachelor of engineering and two years departmental training

 Professional fire fighters (higher technical grades) of Rheinland-Pfalz

Master of engineering and two years of departmental training

 Helmet insignia of Rheinland-Pfalz

Greece

Indonesia 
Firefighters in Indonesia form part of the civil service of local governments and wear variant forms of uniforms worn by civil servants and employees.

Iran 

In Iran, every city has its own fire department, but ranks are the same in the whole country, and are as follows:

Ireland 
In Ireland, the traditional British and Commonwealth brigade rank structure is used, across the 26 counties.

Fire and rescue services are provided by 26 County Councils to the 26 counties of Ireland, and by three city councils with unitary authority status (those of Dublin, Cork, and Galway) within their respective cities. By agreement, the Dublin Fire Brigade provides cover to both the city and the county. Similarly, Galway City Council and Galway County Council have an agreement for the provision of a single fire and rescue service. Only Cork has separate services - Cork City Fire Brigade in the City of Cork, and Cork County Fire Service in the wider County of Cork. In each of the other 23 counties of Ireland a single fire and rescue service covers the whole county, including all large towns and cities, as those 23 county councils are unitary authorities for the entire county jurisdiction.

Israel 

Officers

Other Ranks

Italy

Japan 

The Japanese fire department's rank insignias are place on a small badge and pinned above the right pocket. Rank is told by stripes and hexagram stars. The design of the insignias came from older Japanese style military insignias. Officers and team leaders could wear an arm band on the arm of fire jacket to show status as command leader. Sometimes rank can be shown as different a color fire jacket for command staff. The color whites and gray are reserved for EMS. Orange is reserved for rescuers.

Luxembourg

Malaysia

Netherlands

New Zealand 
In New Zealand, rank is shown on epaulettes on firefighters' station uniform, and through colors and stripes on firefighter helmets. As the nation only has a single fire department, the New Zealand Fire Service, ranks are consistent through the country.

Philippines

Commissioned officers 
Fire director (major general)
Fire chief superintendent (brigadier general)
Fire senior superintendent (colonel)
Fire superintendent (lieutenant colonel)
Fire chief inspector (major)
Fire senior inspector (captain)
Fire inspector (lieutenant)

Non-commissioned officers 
Senior fire officer 4 (executive master sergeant)
Senior fire officer 3 (chief master sergeant)
Senior fire officer 2 (senior master sergeant)
Senior fire officer 1 (master sergeant)
Fire officer 3 (staff sergeant)
Fire officer 2 (corporal)
Fire officer 1 (firefighter)

Poland

Romania 
Officer ranks

Other ranks

Russian Federation 

In the Russian Federation, the decals are applied symmetrically on both sides of the helmet (front and rear). The location of the decals on the special clothing and SCBA is established for each fire department of the same type within the administrative entity. The following ranks are used by State Fire Service civilian personnel worn on all forms of dress, while military personnel use ranks similar to those of the Police of Russia, due to their pre-2001 history as the fire service of the Ministry of Internal Affairs of the Russian Federation before all firefighting services were transferred to the Ministry of Emergency Situations.

Singapore 

Officers

Warrant officers

Other ranks

Switzerland 
Officer grades

Other grades

Taiwan

Tunisia 
Tunisian firefighter's ranks are the same as the army, police and national guard.

United Kingdom

United States 

In the United States, helmet colors often denote a fire fighter's rank or position. In general, white helmets denote chief officers, such as battalion chiefs, division chiefs, etc. while red helmets may denote company officers, such as captains, lieutenants, etc. but the specific meaning of a helmet's color or style varies from region to region and department to department. The rank of an officer in an American fire department is most commonly denoted by a number of speaking trumpets, a reference to a megaphone-like device used in the early days of the fire service, although typically called "bugle" in today's parlance. Ranks proceed from one (lieutenant) to five (fire chief) bugles. Traditional ranks in American fire departments that exist but may not always be utilized in all cities or towns include:

In many fire departments in the U.S., the captain is commonly the commander of a company and a lieutenant is the supervisor of the company's firefighters on shift. There is no state or federal rank structure for firefighters and each municipality or volunteer fire department creates and uses their own unique structure.

Some other American fire departments such as the FDNY (New York City Fire Department) use military rank insignia in addition to or instead of the traditional bugles. Additionally, officers on truck companies have been known to use rank insignias shaped like axes for lieutenants (one) and captains (two).

Vatican City

References 

Firefighters
firefighting